Gaoqing County is a county of northern Shandong province, People's Republic of China. It is the northernmost division of Zibo City.

The population in 1999 was 355405.

Administrative divisions
As 2012, this County is divided to 9 towns.
Towns

Climate

References

External links 

  Official homepage

 
Counties of Shandong
Zibo